Our Lady's High School is a six-year Roman Catholic co-educational comprehensive school which opened in Ravenswood in 1968. It caters for pupils living in Cumbernauld, Muirhead, Cardowan and Stepps and in addition to pupils from Condorrat, Dullatur, Moodiesburn and Castlecary. The school's emblem is a post-modern artistic recreation of the Virgin and child.

History
Prior to its opening in 1968 there was no Roman Catholic high school in Cumbernauld and pupils had to make a 10-mile bus journey to Kirkintilloch to attend St Ninian's.

The school has always maintained a strong link with the surrounding community, and through pupils, parents and teacher links they are associated with several primary schools from which the intake is drawn:

 St Margaret of Scotland Primary School, Cumbernauld
 St Lucy's Primary School, Abronhill
 St Mary's Primary School, Ravenswood
 St Joseph's Primary School, Stepps
 St Barbara's Primary School, Muirhead
 St Andrew's Primary School, Cumbernauld

The former Sacred Heart Primary in Kildrum was also a feeder primary until its closure in 2000. Like Sacred Heart, Our Lady's was architecturally designed by Gillespie, Kidd & Coia.

Houses
The pupils are split into 5 different Houses - St Margaret of Scotland, St John Ogilvie, St Thenew, St Mungo and St Columba.

Notable former pupils

 David Cromwell – oceanographer and co-editor of the Media Lens website
 Mark McGhee – football manager
 Peter Mackie – football player, Celtic F.C. and St Mirren F.C.
 Pauline McNeill – Member of the Scottish Parliament
 Neil Primrose – drummer from Travis

References

External links
School's website
 North Lanarkshire Council website
Our Lady's High School's page on Scottish Schools Online

Catholic secondary schools in North Lanarkshire
1968 establishments in Scotland
Educational institutions established in 1968
Cumbernauld